Ng Pak Nam (born 8 August 1998) is a Hong Kong table tennis player. A native of Fujian, China, he spent five years in Shanghai for table tennis. He is able to represent Hong Kong because his father and grandfather are both Hong Kongers.

Achievements

ITTF Tours
Men's doubles

References

Hong Kong male table tennis players
1998 births
Living people
Table tennis players at the 2018 Asian Games
Chinese male table tennis players
Table tennis players from Fujian
People from Jinjiang, Fujian
Asian Games competitors for Hong Kong
Sportspeople from Quanzhou